Gongylus gongylodes, also known as the wandering violin mantis, ornate mantis, or Indian rose mantis, is a species of praying mantis in the family Empusidae. Characterized by extremely slender limbs with large appendages, it is not a particularly aggressive species and often kept as a pet. The mantis is especially known for swaying its body back and forth to imitate a stick flowing in the wind. 
It primarily feeds on flying insects. Its native range is in southern India and Sri Lanka. The males of the species are capable of flight. They are a communal species, in that they are able to live and breed in large groups, without unnecessary cannibalism.
Adult females are about 10cm (3 in) and adult males are about 9 cm.

Its specific name gongylodes means "roundish" in Greek, from the same word as its generic epithet Gongylus.

Range
They are found in India, Java, Myanmar, Sri Lanka, and Thailand.

Gallery

References

External links

Empusidae
Mantodea of Asia
Insects of India
Insects of Sri Lanka
Insects described in 1758
Taxa named by Carl Linnaeus